WMDE (channel 36) is a television station licensed to Dover, Delaware, United States. Despite its physical location well east of the center of the market and across Chesapeake Bay, the station is assigned by Nielsen to the Washington, D.C. television market. With the repeal of the Federal Communications Commission (FCC)'s Main Studio Rule in 2019, WMDE is fully automated out of WRNN-TV's studios in Rye Brook, New York, with no local presence whatsoever.

Outside of a morning rebroadcast of the Japanese network Fuji TV's News Catch program, the station's schedule on its main channel is made up of home shopping programming from ShopHQ, which also airs on the main channel of all of WRNN's stations.

History
WMDE signed on May 24, 2013. The station was originally owned by Western Pacific Broadcast LLC.

Shortly after sign-on, Nielsen granted WMDE's request to be assigned to the Washington market instead of Philadelphia (where Dover is located) or Baltimore (where Wye Mills is located). WMDE is thus carried on every cable and satellite provider in the Washington market, with the exception of Cox Communications, which filed a complaint to the FCC seeking to avoid carriage and prevailed in 2015. Although the FCC's ruling called Nielsen's market modification decision "inexplicable", must-carry rules otherwise defer to Nielsen with respect to market assignment.

WRNN-TV Associates agreed to acquire the station for $11.5 million on April 25, 2018; the sale was completed on July 11, 2018.

Subchannels
The station's digital signal is multiplexed:

References

Television channels and stations established in 2013
2013 establishments in Delaware
MDE
MDE
MDE
TrueReal affiliates
Dabl affiliates
Circle (TV network) affiliates